Andrew Carrington (born 14 November 1936) was an English professional footballer who played as a defender.

References

1936 births
Living people
Footballers from Grimsby
English footballers
Association football defenders
Grimsby Town F.C. players
English Football League players